Li Hong (born 31 May 1999) is a field hockey player from China, who plays as a midfielder.

Career

Under–18
In 2014, Li Hong was a member of the China U–18 team that won gold at the 2014 Youth Olympics in Nanjing.

Under–21
Hong was a member of the China U–21 from 2013–2016, representing the team for the first time at just 13 years of age. She appeared in two FIH Junior World Cups, in 2013 and 2016.

Senior national team
Following a successful junior career, Li Hong debuted for the Chinese senior team in 2016.

Hong was a member of the bronze medal winning team at the 2018 Asian Games.

In 2019, Hong was a member of the Chinese team throughout the inaugural season of the FIH Pro League.

International goals

References

External links
 

1999 births
Living people
Female field hockey midfielders
Chinese female field hockey players
Field hockey players at the 2018 Asian Games
Medalists at the 2018 Asian Games
Asian Games bronze medalists for China
Asian Games medalists in field hockey
Field hockey players at the 2020 Summer Olympics
Olympic field hockey players of China